Biemans is a Dutch surname. Notable people with the surname include:

 Bart Biemans (born 1988), Belgian footballer
 Bobby Biemans (born 1982), Dutch darts player
 Ienne Biemans (born 1944), Dutch author of children's literature

See also
 Biemann

Dutch-language surnames